Glenn is a given name and a surname.

Name
The surname Glenn is derived from the Irish name gleann. In the 19th century, Glenn also became common as a given name in English speaking cultures.

In Sweden, Glenn is relatively common first name in the western parts of the country but especially Gothenburg, originally due to a large and influential population of emigrated Scotsmen, especially in the city's early centuries. The name was very prevalent in the local football team IFK Göteborg which in the early 1980s had no fewer than four players named Glenn, including Glenn Hysén and Glenn Strömberg.

Given name
Glenn may refer to:

In music
 Glenn Branca (1948–2018), American avant-garde composer and guitarist.
 Glenn Danzig (born 1955), American rock musician
 Glenn Frey (1948–2016),  American rock musician, founding member of The Eagles
 Glenn Gould (1932–1982), Canadian pianist
 Glenn Gregory (born 1958), English pop musician
 Glen Hansard (born 1970), Irish singer-songwriter
 Glenn Hughes (born 1952), English rock musician
 Glenn Hughes (Village People) (1950–2001), musician known for his work with the Village People
 Glenn Medeiros (born 1970), American singer/songwriter
 Glenn Miller (1904–1944), American jazz musician
 Glenn Ong (born 1970), Singaporean DJ
 Glenn Schwartz (1940–2018), American musician, member of the band Pacific Gas & Electric
 Glenn Tilbrook (born 1957), British musician
 Glenn Tipton (born 1947), English rock musician
 Glenn Wheatley (1948–2022), Australian musician, talent manager and tour promoter
 Glenn Yarbrough (1930–2016), American folk singer
 The Extra Glenns, American musical duo in the 1990s

In other fields
Glenn Beck (born 1964), American talk-radio and television host
Glenn Brummer (born 1954), American baseball player
Glenn Close (born 1947), American actress
Glenn Consor, American-Israeli NBA and NCAA basketball analyst, who played collegiate and pro basketball
Glenn Corbett (1930–1993), American actor
Glenn Cowan (1952–2004), American table tennis player
Glenn Cox (1931–2012), American baseball player
Glenn Eichler (born 1956), American comedy writer
Glenn Flear (born 1959), British chess player
Glenn Ford (1916–2006), American actor
Glenn Glass (born 1940), American football player
Glenn Greenwald (born 1967), American author and blogger
Glenn Hoddle (born 1957), English footballer
Glenn Howerton (born 1976), American actor, producer and screenwriter
Glenn Hysén (born 1959), Swedish football player
Glenn Jacobs (born 1967), American professional wrestler known as "Kane"
Glenn Johnson (born 1984), English footballer
Glenn E. Martin (born 1970), American advocate 
Glenn L. Martin (born 1886), aviation pioneer
Glenn Lazarus (born 1965), Australian footballer
Glenn Loovens (born 1983), Dutch football player
Glenn Love (born 1989), American football player
Glenn McGrath (born 1970), Australian cricketer
Glenn McQueen (1960–2002), Canadian animator
Glenn Muenkat (born 1999), Canadian soccer player
Glenn Quinn (1970–2002), Irish actor
Glenn Rubenstein (born 1976), American journalist
Glenn Ross (born 1971), British strongman/powerlifter
Glenn T. Seaborg (1912–1999), American chemist, Nobel Prize laureate
Glenn Sears, American race car driver
Glenn Shadix (1952–2010), American actor
Glenn Sparkman, American baseball pitcher
Glenn Stearns (born 1963), American businessman, founder of Stearns Lending
Glenn Stewart (born 1984), Australian rugby player
Glenn Strange (1899–1973), American actor
Glenn Strömberg (born 1960), Swedish football player
Glenn E. Trowbridge (born 1943), American politician
Glenn Turner (born 1947), New Zealand cricketer
Glenn Whelan (born 1984), Irish footballer
Glenn Withrow (born 1953), American actor
Glenn Young (1929–2013), American football player

Fictional characters
 Glenn, from the video game Chrono Cross
 Glenn (a.k.a. Frog), from the video game Chrono Trigger
 Glenn Cullen, a fictional character in the BBC Television series The Thick of It
 Glenn Donovan, a fictional character in the British soap opera Hollyoaks
 Glenn Martin, a fictional character in Nickelodeon's TV series Glenn Martin, DDS
 Glenn Matthews, otherwise known as The Janitor from the TV series Scrubs
 Glenn Quagmire, from the animated American television sitcom Family Guy
 Glenn Rhee, a fictional character in the comic The Walking Dead and the television series of the same name
 Glenn Wakeman, a fictional character from the animated series My Life as a Teenage Robot episode "Never Say Uncle", depicted as main protagonist Jenny's friendly swamp monster cousin
Glenn Fraldarius, an unplayable character from the tactical roleplaying game Fire Emblem: Three Houses.
Glenn, a Bad Place demon from the TV show The Good Place.
Glenn, a lead character form the movie Accepted

Surname
 Aaron Glenn (born 1972), American football cornerback
 Alex Glenn (born 1988), New Zealand Rugby League player
 Alice Glenn (1921–2011), former Irish Fine Gael politician
 Amber Glenn (born 1999), American figure skater
 Annie Glenn (1920–2020), wife of former astronaut and Senator John Glenn
 Brad Glenn (born 1987), American professional baseball outfielder
 Brianna Glenn (born 1980), American long jumper
 Cam Glenn (born 1996), American football player
 Cheryl Glenn (born 1951), American politician
 Cheryl Glenn (academic), scholar and teacher
 Christopher Glenn (1938–2006), American radio and television news journalist
 Cody Glenn (born 1986), American football linebacker
 Cordy Glenn (born 1989), American football offensive tackle
 Cornelia Deaderick Glenn (1854–1926), First Lady of North Carolina
 Darrell Glenn (1935–1990), American pop singer
 David Glenn (footballer) (born 1962), English professional footballer
 David Glenn (garden designer), plantsman
 David Glenn (pioneer) (1753–1820), Kentucky Frontiersman
 Devon Glenn, member of American rock band Buckcherry
 Diana Glenn (born 1974), Australian actress
 Ed Glenn (shortstop) (1875–1911), American professional baseball shortstop
 Ed Glenn (outfielder) (1860–1892), American professional baseball outfielder
 Evelyn Nakano Glenn, professor of gender studies
 Freddie Glenn (born 1957), American spree killer and rapist
 Gary Glenn, American politician
 Gene W. Glenn (born 1928), American politician
 Glen Glenn (singer) (born 1934), American rockabilly singer
 Glen Glenn (sound engineer) (1907–1960), American sound recorder
 Graham Glenn (born 1933), former senior Australian public servant
 Hugh J. Glenn (1824–1883), businessman and California politician
 J. Glenn, American drummer
 Jacoby Glenn (born 1993), American football cornerback
 Jason Glenn (born 1979), American football linebacker
 Jerome C. Glenn (born 1945), futurist
 Jim Glenn (born 1948), American politician
 Jimmy Glenn (born 1972), American soccer forward
 Joe Glenn (American football) (born 1949), American football coach
 Joe Glenn (baseball) (1908–1985), Major League catcher
 John Glenn (disambiguation), multiple people
 John Glenn (1921–2016), American test pilot, astronaut, and senator
 Jonathan Glenn (born 1987), Trinidad and Tobago footballer
 Josh Glenn (born 1994), Australian professional footballer
 Joshua Glenn (born 1967), American writer and editor
 Kerry Glenn (born 1962), American professional football player
 Kevin Glenn (born 1979), Canadian Football League quarterback
 Kimiko Glenn (born 1989), American actress and singer
 Larry Glenn (born 1947), American politician
 Linda MacDonald Glenn, American bioethicist
 Lorri Neilsen Glenn, Canadian poet, ethnographer and essayist
 Luther Glenn (1818–1886), American lawyer, politician, and mayor
 Malcom Glenn (born 1987), American writer and political commentator
 Michael Glenn (cricketer) (born 1956), English cricketer
 Mike Glenn (born 1955), American basketball player
 Oliver Edmunds Glenn (1878–?), American mathematician
 Otis F. Glenn (1879–1959), Republican United States Senator from the State of Illinois
 Owen Glenn (born 1940), New Zealand businessman and philanthropist
 Pierre-William Glenn (born 1943), French cinematographer
 Ricardo Glenn (born 1990), American basketball player
 Rick Glenn (born 1989) is an American mixed martial artist
 Robert Broadnax Glenn (1854–1920), American politician and governor of North Carolina
 Rod Glenn, English author and actor
 Roy Glenn (1914–1971), American character actor
 Rudy Glenn (born 1958), American soccer player
 Ryan Glenn (born 1980), Canadian professional ice hockey defenceman
 Sammy Glenn (born 1983), English actress
 Scott Glenn (born 1941), American actor
 Stanley Glenn (1926–2011), American baseball catcher
 Steven Glenn (born 1971), Canadian football linebacker
 Tarik Glenn (born 1976), American football offensive tackle
 Terry Glenn (1974–2017), American football wide receiver
 Thomas G. Glenn, Canadian opera singer
 Thomas L. Glenn (1847–1918), United States Representative from Idaho
 Tyler Glenn (born 1983), American singer, songwriter, and musician
 Tyree Glenn (1912–1979), American musician
 Vencie Glenn (born 1964), American football safety
 Wendy Glenn, English actress
 William Glenn (disambiguation), multiple people
 William Glenn (1914–2003), American cardiac surgeon

Fictional characters
 George Glenn, fictional character from the anime series Mobile Suit Gundam SEED
 Marlena Glenn, maiden name of Queen Marlena, fictional character from the Masters of the Universe franchise, queen consort of Eternos and mother of He-Manʼs alter ego Prince Adam.
 Ted Glen, fictional character and friend of Pat in Postman Pat series.

See also
 Glen (given name)
 Glen (surname)

English unisex given names
Masculine given names